This article lists the winners and nominees for the NAACP Image Award for Outstanding Directing in a Drama Series. The award was first given during the 2006 ceremony and since its inception, Paris Barclay; Ernest R. Dickerson; and Carl Franklin hold the record for the most wins with two each.

Winners and nominees
Winners are listed first and highlighted in bold.

2000s

2010s

2020s

Multiple wins and nominations

Wins
 2 wins
 Paris Barclay
 Ernest R. Dickerson
 Carl Franklin

Nominations

 9 nominations
 Paris Barclay

 7 nominations
 Ernest R. Dickerson

 5 nominations
 Seith Mann
 Millicent Shelton

 4 nominations
 Anthony Hemingway

 3 nominations
 Janice Cooke
 Hanelle Culpepper
 Carl Franklin

 2 nominations
 Kevin Hooks
 Carl Seaton
 Kevin Sullivan

References

NAACP Image Awards